Ryan Beard (born 1988/1989) is an American football coach and former player who is currently the head coach for the Missouri State Bears of the Missouri Valley Football Conference (MVFC). He played college football at Western Kentucky and later coached them, Louisville, Northern Michigan, and Central Michigan before receiving a job at Missouri State in 2020.

Early life and education
A native of Bowling Green, Kentucky, Beard attended Bowling Green High School where he played football for four seasons and helped them reach the Class 3A championship twice. He began playing college football for the Western Kentucky Hilltoppers in 2007 as a defensive back and was an all-freshman selection. Beard became a starter in 2008. He graduated following the 2011 season and has two degrees from Western Kentucky: a bachelor of science in business management and a master of science in recreation and sports administration. He was twice named All-Sun Belt Conference in his time with the Hilltoppers and was also an all-academic selection, additionally being given the school's "Iron Man Award" as a senior after posting 51 stops. His career-high in tackles came as a junior in 2010, when he recorded 71.

Coaching career
Beard began his coaching career immediately after graduating from Western Kentucky, serving as the Hilltoppers' defensive graduate assistant from 2012 to 2013. He served as the defensive quality control coach for the Louisville Cardinals in 2014, and after one season in that position, became an assistant at Northern Michigan, working with the cornerbacks.

Beard was to serve as Northern Michigan secondary coach in 2016, but left for Western Kentucky in July of that year. He served as their defensive backs coach for one season. In 2017, he returned to Louisville, where he served as an assistant for two seasons. Beard coached the special teams and safeties at Central Michigan in 2019.

Beard was named defensive coordinator and safeties coach for the Missouri State Bears in 2020. In his first season in the position, he helped them set the school record for single-season sacks and reach the playoffs for the first time in 30 years. The next year, the Bears defense again broke the single-season sack record and they made the playoffs for the second consecutive year. Following the 2022 season, where Missouri State went 5–6 and missed the playoffs, Beard was named the new head coach.

Personal life
Beard is married to Katie, the daughter of Bobby Petrino, whom Beard succeeded as Missouri State head coach in 2023. As of 2022, they have four children together.

References

1980s births
Living people
American football defensive backs
Players of American football from Kentucky
Sportspeople from Bowling Green, Kentucky
Western Kentucky Hilltoppers football players
Western Kentucky Hilltoppers football coaches
Louisville Cardinals football coaches
Central Michigan Chippewas football coaches
Missouri State Bears football coaches